Gerónimo Prisciantelli (born 23 August 1999) is an Argentine rugby union player, currently playing for United Rugby Championship side . His preferred position is centre or wing.

Professional career
Prisciantelli signed for Súper Liga Americana de Rugby side  ahead of the 2021 Súper Liga Americana de Rugby season. He played for Jaguares also for 2022 Súper Liga Americana de Rugby season.

International career
He had previously represented Argentina U20s and Argentina Sevens in 2019.

In summer 2022 he was selected for Argentina XV squad for official tests.

References

External links
itsrugby.co.uk Profile

1999 births
Living people
Argentine rugby union players
Rugby union centres
Rugby union wings
Jaguares (Super Rugby) players
Rugby union fullbacks
Rugby union players from Buenos Aires
Rugby union fly-halves
Zebre Parma players